Taras Kozyra (born September 26, 1941) is a former politician in Ontario, Canada.  He was a Liberal member of the Legislative Assembly of Ontario from 1987 to 1990.

Background
Kozrya moved to Canada at a young age, and was educated at the University of Western Ontario and Lakehead University.  He worked in Thunder Bay as a teacher.

Politics
He served as a councillor in the Thunder Bay City Council from 1972 to 1978 and from 1982 to 1987.

He was elected to the Ontario legislature in the 1987 provincial election, defeating NDP candidate Chris Southcott by just under 2,000 votes in the riding of Port Arthur. He served as a backbench supporter of David Peterson's government for the next three years, and was parliamentary assistant to the Minister of Northern Development on two occasions.

The Liberals lost to the NDP in the 1990 provincial election, and Kozyra lost his seat to NDP candidate Shelley Wark-Martyn by 1,034 votes.

Later life
Kozyra was the principal of the English section of the Korean International School of Hong Kong (KIS) between 2004 and 2006.

References

External links

1941 births
Lakehead University alumni
Living people
Ontario Liberal Party MPPs
Thunder Bay city councillors
University of Western Ontario alumni